The 1869 Rutgers Queensmen football team represented Rutgers University in the 1869 college football season. The team finished with a 1–1 record and was retroactively named the co-national champion by Parke H. Davis. They played Princeton two times, splitting the series one game apiece. The team had no coach, and its captain was William Leggett.

Schedule

See also
 List of historically significant college football games
 List of the first college football games in each U.S. state

References

Rutgers
Rutgers Scarlet Knights football seasons
College football national champions
Rutgers Queensmen football